Jehudi Ashmun (April 21, 1794 – August 25, 1828) was an American religious leader and social reformer from New England who became involved in the American Colonization Society. It founded the colony of Liberia in West Africa as a place to resettle free people of color from the United States.

Ashmun emigrated to Monrovia, Liberia in 1822, where he served as the United States government's agent (de facto governor) for two different terms: one from August 1822 until April 1824, and another from August 1824 until March 1828. Suffering ill health, he returned to the United States and died later that year.

Early life and education 
Born in Champlain, New York, in 1794, Ashmun first studied at Middlebury College in Vermont. During his senior year, he studied at the University of Vermont. After graduation, he was ordained in Maine as a minister.

Marriage and family
Ashmun married in 1818 and his wife accompanied him to Bangor, Maine, where he took his first position.

Career
Ashmun was appointed as the first principal, and one of the first two professors, of the Bangor Theological Seminary in Bangor, Maine.  He retained this professorship until 1827, despite leaving the country for a few years while living and working in the new colony of Monrovia, Liberia.

Drawn by other opportunities, Ashmun returned to the United States, settling in Washington, DC, where he worked as the editor of an Episcopalian monthly. Interested in the work of the American Colonization Society (ACS), he founded the newspaper The African Intelligencer and wrote about their mission.

His articles about the ACS, which was committed to "repatriating" free blacks to a newly founded colony in West Africa, led to Ashmun's political appointment as representative of the U.S. government to the colony. While the project was privately funded, it was chartered by Congress. At the age of 26, Ashmun was the leader in 1822 of a group of settlers and missionaries to Liberia on the ship Elizabeth. His wife went with him but was among the many settlers who died of malaria and other tropical diseases in the new settlement.

As United States representative to Liberia as well as agent of the ACS, Ashmun effectively served as governor of the colony for two periods of time, from 1822 to 1828, from ages 28 to 34. He took a leadership role in what he found to be a demoralized colony. He helped build the defenses of Monrovia against attacks by indigenous tribes, as well as against slave raiders. He also worked to develop the colony's trade with the US, Great Britain, and Europe. During his tenure in Liberia, Ashmun increased agricultural production, annexed more lands from neighboring tribes, and exploited commercial opportunities in the interior.

He helped create a constitution for Liberia that enabled African Americans to hold positions in the government. African Americans and their descendants, known as Americo-Liberians, dominated the government into the late 20th century.

By contrast, in the early decades of the neighboring British colony of Sierra Leone, the government was dominated by whites. Freetown was originally founded for the resettlement of free blacks from Britain and Upper Canada (many of them were Black Loyalists and their descendants: freed African-American slaves who had joined the British for freedom during the American Revolutionary War).

Ashmun wrote numerous letters to ACS officials, family and friends in the United States. These and  his book, History of the American Colony in Liberia, 1821–1823 (1826) constitute the earliest written history of the Liberia colony.

Death
Suffering ill health in Liberia, Ashmun returned to the United States in 1828. He died in New Haven, Connecticut, soon after. He was interred there in Grove Street Cemetery.

Legacy and honors

Lincoln University, a historically black college in Pennsylvania, was originally chartered in 1854 as Ashmun Institute in his honor.

Notes

Further reading
Charles I.  Foster, “The Colonization of Free Negroes, in Liberia, 1816–1835”, The Journal of Negro History (1953)
Ralph Randolph Gurley, Life of Jehudi Ashmun, Late Colonial Agent in Liberia, Boston: J. C. Dunn, 1835  
Frankie Hutton, “Economic Considerations in the American Colonization Society’s Early Effort to Emigrate Free Blacks to Liberia, 1816–36", The Journal of Negro History (1983), via JSTOR
P. J. Staudenraus, The African Colonization Movement 1816–1865 (New York: Columbia University Press, 1961)

1794 births
1828 deaths
Agents and Governors of Liberia
Burials at Grove Street Cemetery
Politicians from Bangor, Maine
People from Champlain, New York
Bangor Theological Seminary faculty
Middlebury College alumni
University of Vermont alumni
American social reformers
American colonization movement